Parliamentarian has two principal meanings. 

First, it may refer to a member or supporter of a Parliament, as in:

Member of parliament
Roundhead, supporter of the parliamentary cause in the English Civil War

Second, in countries that do not refer to their legislative bodies as a parliament, parliamentarian may instead refer to an expert adviser on parliamentary procedure, as in:

Parliamentarian (consultant), an officer or outside consultant designated by an organization to serve as an expert in parliamentary procedure
Parliamentarian of the United States House of Representatives
Parliamentarian of the United States Senate
A member of the National Association of Parliamentarians
A member of the American Institute of Parliamentarians
An official of the National Forensic League, who regulates a chamber of Student Congress

See also
Parliament
Parliamentary system
Parliament of England
Parliamentary procedure
Councilor